Great Southern Highway is a highway in the southern Wheatbelt region of Western Australia, starting from Great Eastern Highway at The Lakes,  from Perth, and ending at Albany Highway near Cranbrook. It is the primary thoroughfare for this part of Western Australia and runs parallel with the Perth-Albany railway for its entire length. It is signed as State Route 120 from York to Cranbrook, and was first named in 1949, although it was built well before that time.

Description
The highway initially travels east to the historic town of York, before following the Avon Valley and the railway roughly southwards until Narrogin. The highway then runs parallel with Albany Highway at a distance of about  through Wagin and Katanning before curving to approach Albany Highway where it ends  past Cranbrook. Many of the towns along this highway have prominent grain silos, and Narrogin, Wagin and Katanning have remained important population centres sustained by agriculture and its supporting industries.

Towns 

Towns on this highway include:
 The Lakes
 York
 Beverley
 Brookton
 Pingelly
 Popanyinning
 Cuballing
 Narrogin
 Highbury
 Wagin
 Woodanilling
 Katanning
 Broomehill
 Tambellup
 Cranbrook

See also

 Highways in Australia
 List of highways in Western Australia

References

Highways in rural Western Australia
Wheatbelt (Western Australia)